Lolita Chammah (born 1 October 1983) is a French actress.

Background
She grew up in Paris and already had her first roles during childhood.

Lolita Chammah has one son, Gabriel Merz Chammah. At the age of 8 he was allowed to accompany his mother to the 2021 Cannes Film Festival.

Career

In the role of the film daughter of her mother, Isabelle Huppert, she participated in Copacabana and again 2017 in Barrage. During the first ten years of her career Chammah participated mainly in comedies, as well as some dramas.

Selected filmography

References

External links

 

1983 births
21st-century French actresses
Actresses from Paris
French film actresses
French people of Hungarian-Jewish descent
French people of Lebanese-Jewish descent
Jewish French actresses
Living people